New Jersey's 39th Legislative District is one of 40 in the state, including portions of Bergen County and Passaic County. Included are the Bergen County municipalities of Closter, Demarest, Dumont, Emerson, Harrington Park, Haworth, Hillsdale, Mahwah, Montvale, Norwood, Oakland, Old Tappan, Park Ridge, Ramsey, River Vale, Saddle River, Upper Saddle River, Washington Township, Westwood, and Woodcliff Lake; and the Passaic County municipalities of Bloomingdale, Ringwood, and Wanaque. As of the 2020 United States census, the district had a population of 217,994.

Demographic characteristics
As of the 2020 United States census, the district had a population of 217,994, of whom 172,439 (79.1%) were of voting age. The racial makeup of the district was 162,440 (74.5%) White, 4,051 (1.9%) African American, 645 (0.3%) Native American, 26,509 (12.2%) Asian, 31 (0.0%) Pacific Islander, 7,565 (3.5%) from some other race, and 16,753 (7.7%) from two or more races. Hispanic or Latino of any race were 22,937 (10.5%) of the population.

The district had 180,183 registered voters as of December 1, 2021, of whom 72,087 (40.0%) were registered as unaffiliated, 54,143 (30.0%) were registered as Democrats, 52,510 (29.1%) were registered as Republicans, and 1,443 (0.8%) were registered to other parties.

The district, which covers most of Northern Bergen County, has the smallest African-American population of any district in the state and ranks 31st in the number of Hispanic residents, while it has the ninth highest percentage of Asian residents. At 0.3% it has the lowest percentage of children receiving Temporary Assistance for Needy Families aid, just over 5% of the state average. The district ranked second-highest in both equalized property value and personal income on a per capita basis.

Political representation
For the 2022–2023 session, the district is represented in the State Senate by Holly Schepisi (R, River Vale) and in the General Assembly by Robert Auth (R, Old Tappan) and DeAnne DeFuccio (R, Upper Saddle River).

The legislative district is located within New Jersey's 5th and 9th congressional districts.

Apportionment history
Throughout most of the district's history since 1973, the year the 40-district legislative map was created in New Jersey, the 39th District has encompassed the small affluent boroughs and townships in northeast Bergen County. In the redistrictings of 1981 and 1991, only a few municipalities were added and removed to get the district's population close to one fortieth of the state's population as required under the Reynolds v. Sims ruling.

Changes to the district made as part of the New Jersey Legislative apportionment in 2001 removed Englewood Cliffs and Tenafly (to the 37th Legislative District added Oradell (from the 38th Legislative District) and Waldwick and Washington Township (from the 40th Legislative District).

With Democrat Brendan Byrne at the top of the ticket winning the race for Governor of New Jersey, Frank Herbert won the 1977 race for Senate in the 39th District, standing together with his running mates in support of the establishment of a state income tax to defeat Republican John Markert.

In the 1979 election, Gerald Cardinale and Markert defeated incumbent Democrat Greta Kiernan, who had herself defeated Markert two years earlier.

Cardinale knocked off the incumbent State Senator Frank Herbert in 1981 and Herbert fell short again running against Cardinale in 1983, losing by about 1,000 votes.

Citing recent hip replacement surgery as a factor, John E. Rooney announce in March 2009 that he would not seek another term of office and would retire after 26 years in the legislature. He endorsed Bob Schroeder, a Washington Township councilmember, who won election to succeed him. After Charlotte Vandervalk decided not to run for re-election in 2011, Holly Schepisi ran in her place and won together with the other Republican incumbents.

Changes to the district made as part of the New Jersey Legislative apportionment in 2011 removed several Bergen County municipalities and added portions of Passaic County and northwest Bergen County.

Election history

Election results

Senate

General Assembly

References

Bergen County, New Jersey
Passaic County, New Jersey
39